Scoparia monochroma is a species of moth in the family Crambidae.  It is endemic to New Zealand.

Taxonomy
It was described by John Salmon in 1946. However, the placement of this species within the genus Scoparia is in doubt. As a result, this species has also been referred to as Scoparia (s.l.) monochroma.

References

External links
 Image of S. monochroma.

Moths described in 1946
Moths of New Zealand
Scorparia
Endemic fauna of New Zealand
Endemic moths of New Zealand